The Garden City Western Railway  is a railroad operating in the U.S. state of Kansas. GCW was organized in 1916, first owned by The Garden City Sugar and Land Company and then owned by the Garden City Coop, Inc. The GCW is located in southwest Kansas and totals  of operating railroad and interchanges with BNSF Railway. GCW was purchased by Pioneer Railcorp on April 29, 1999. The primary commodities include grain, frozen beef, fertilizer, farm implements, feed products and utility poles.

History

The Garden City Sugar and Land Company, at Garden City, Kansas, built a railroad known as the Garden City Western Railway, constructed in 1915. This railroad extends from the Sugar Factory at Garden City in a northwesterly direction about  through farm lands, held by the Garden City Sugar and Land Company. Road built to take care of products of Garden City Sugar and Land Company's holdings in land. 
   
The Nebraska, Kansas and Southern Railway track was laid out  from Garden City and was never operational. The rail, fastenings and ties from this railroad were sold in 1915 at a Sheriff's auction to the Garden City Western Railway Company, a subsidiary of the Garden City Sugar and Land Company.

On 1 September 1991 the Garden City Northern Railway (GCNR) merged with the Garden City Western Railway.

A GCW steam locomotive is currently on static display at the Lee Richardson Zoo in Garden City, located behind the Snack/Gift Shop and across the Drive-In Entrance/Kiosk.

References

American companies established in 1915
Kansas railroads
Pioneer Lines
Railway companies established in 1915
Switching and terminal railroads